Noyers-Auzécourt is a commune in the Meuse department in Grand Est in north-eastern France.

Geography
The Chée flows southwestward through the middle of the commune.

See also
Communes of the Meuse department

References

Noyersauzecourt